CTFS can refer to:
 Continuous-time Fourier series
 "Capture The Flag Strike" of Threewave CTF in Quake III Arena.
 Center for Tropical Forest Science of the Smithsonian Tropical Research Institute
 Creative and Tactical Fighting Systems